Eupithecia ogilviata is a moth in the  family Geometridae. It is found on the Azores.

References

Moths described in 1905
ogilviata
Moths of Europe